Jeff W. Lichtman (born 1951) is an American neuroscientist. He is the Jeremy R. Knowles Professor of Molecular and Cellular Biology and Santiago Ramón y Cajal Professor of Arts and Sciences at Harvard University. He is best known for his pioneering work developing  the neuroimaging connectomic technique known as Brainbow.

Education and career
Lichtman was born in Salt Lake City, Utah in 1951. He grew up in the Northeastern United States. Lichtman received a BA from Bowdoin College in 1973. In 1980, he received both MD and PhD from Washington University in St. Louis, where he was advised by Dale Purves. After completing postdoctoral work at Harvard Medical School, he established his lab at Washington University School of Medicine and conducted research there for 30 years.

In 2004, he was appointed Jeremy R. Knowles Professor of Molecular and Cellular Biology  at Harvard University. In 2013, he was named the inaugural Santiago Ramón y Cajal Professor, a five-year appointment intended to recognize outstanding research and teaching. Lichtman is a faculty member within the Harvard Center for Brain Science and the Conte Center at Harvard University. From 2013 to 2016, he was a Grass Foundation Trustee.

Research

The Lichtman lab studies activity-dependent plasticity in motor and autonomic circuits of living animals. Lichtman hypothesizes that axons undergo synaptic pruning and strengthening in response to experiences, and these experiences cause neurons which co-innervate the same cell to compete for dominance, thereby driving synaptic plasticity. The lab uses genetically modified mice and automated imaging tools to identify neural circuit motifs throughout the nervous system.

In 2007, Lichtman and Joshua R. Sanes first published the Brainbow mouse method, in which different fluorescent proteins are expressed stochastically in neighboring neurons within a mouse's nervous system, thereby allowing neighboring neuronal processes to be distinguishable by fluorescence microscopy. Subsequently, this technique has been adapted and used to map neural circuits in mice, Caenorhabditis elegans, and Drosophila melanogaster.

Additionally, the Lichtman lab developed a  device called the Automatic Tape-Collecting Lathe Ultramicrotome (ATLUM), which can be used for automated electron microscopy in neural circuit reconstruction. Data from the Lichtman lab has been used in the citizen science game EyeWire, developed in collaboration with Sebastian Seung and Winfried Denk, to construct a full connectome of the mouse retina.

The  lab is also interested in inhibitory interneurons in the prefrontal cortex, which are thought to be selectively vulnerable in mental disorders such as autism or schizophrenia.

Awards and honors

 Member, National Academy of Sciences (2014)
 Transformative Research R01 Award,  National Institutes of Health (2011)

References

Living people
1951 births
Date of birth missing (living people)
American neuroscientists
21st-century scientists
Bowdoin College alumni
Washington University School of Medicine alumni
Harvard University faculty